Sosibia is an Asian genus of stick insects in the family Lonchodidae and subfamily Necrosciinae.

Species
The Phasmida Species File lists:
 Sosibia aeneicollis (Redtenbacher, 1908)
 Sosibia aurita (Fabricius, 1793)
 Sosibia curtipes (Westwood, 1848)
 Sosibia euryalus (Westwood, 1859)
 Sosibia flavomarginata Chen & He, 2008
 Sosibia gibba Li & Bu, 2022
 Sosibia guangdongensis Chen & Chen, 2000
 Sosibia medogensis Chen & He, 2004
 Sosibia nigrispina Stål, 1875 - type species
 Sosibia ovata Li & Bu, 2022
 Sosibia passalus (Westwood, 1859)
 Sosibia peninsularis Kirby, 1904
 Sosibia pholidotus (Westwood, 1859)
 Sosibia quadrispinosa Redtenbacher, 1908
 Sosibia spinoaurita Seow-Choen, 2021

References

External links
 
 

Lonchodidae
Phasmatodea genera
Phasmatodea of Asia